The Daily Sketch was a British national tabloid newspaper, founded in Manchester in 1909 by Sir Edward Hulton.

It was bought in 1920 by Lord Rothermere's Daily Mirror Newspapers, but in 1925 Rothermere sold it to William and Gomer Berry (later Viscount Camrose and Viscount Kemsley).

It was owned by a subsidiary of the Berrys' Allied Newspapers from 1928 (renamed Kemsley Newspapers in 1937 when Camrose withdrew to concentrate his efforts on The Daily Telegraph). In 1946, it was merged with the Daily Graphic. In 1952, Kemsley decided to sell the paper to Associated Newspapers, the owner of the Daily Mail, who promptly revived the Daily Sketch name in 1953. The paper struggled through the 1950s and 1960s, never managing to compete successfully with the Daily Mirror, and in 1971 it was closed and merged with the Daily Mail.

The Sketch was Conservative in its politics and populist in its tone during its existence through all its changes of ownership. In some ways, much of the more populist element of today's Daily Mail was inherited from the Sketch: before the merger, the more serious Mail, previously a broadsheet, was also right-wing. The Sketch notably launched a moral panic over Daniel Farson's 1960 television documentary Living for Kicks, a portrait of British teenage life at the time, which led to a war of words between the Sketch and the Daily Mirror. It also participated in the press campaign against the screening of the BBC film The War Game.

Editors

1909: Jimmy Heddle
1914: William Sugden Robinson
1919: H. Lane
1922: H. Gates
1923: H. Lane
1926: Ivor Halstead 
1928: A. Curthoys
1936: A. Sinclair
1939: Sydney Carroll
1942: Lionel Berry
1943: A. Roland Thornton and M. Watts
1944: A. Roland Thornton
1947: N. Hamilton
1948: Henry Clapp
1953: Herbert Gunn
1959: Colin Valdar
1962: Howard French
1969: David English
1971: Louis Kirby (acting)

References

External links 
 144 issues from 1915-1916 at The University of Pretoria

1871 disestablishments in the United Kingdom
1909 establishments in the United Kingdom
Daily Mail and General Trust
Defunct daily newspapers
Defunct newspapers published in the United Kingdom
Newspapers published in Manchester
Publications established in 1909
Publications disestablished in 1971